David Kenny (born 10 January 1999) is an Irish racewalking athlete. He represented Ireland at the 2020 Summer Olympics in the men's 20 kilometres walk.

Career
Kenny represented Ireland at the 2019 European Athletics U23 Championships in the 20 kilometres walk and finished in ninth place with a personal best time of 1:25:43. He again represented Ireland at the 2021 European Athletics U23 Championships in the 20 kilometres walk and won a silver medal with a time of 1:25:50. This was Ireland's ninth medal at the European Athletics U23 Championships, and first-ever racewalking medal.

Kenny is coached by former Olympic medal-winning race walker Robert Heffernan. He represented Ireland at the 2020 Summer Olympics in the men's 20 kilometres walk and finished in 29th place.

References

External links
 
 
 
 

1999 births
living people
Irish male racewalkers
Olympic athletes of Ireland
Athletes (track and field) at the 2020 Summer Olympics